This is a list of term limits for heads of state, heads of government and other notable public office holders by country.

Africa

Americas

Asia

Middle East

Europe

Oceania

See also 
 Term limit
 Reelection

References

Sources
 CIA World Factbook

Term limits
Term limits